Imran Hashmi is a Pakistani footballer, who plays for PIA FC. He is also a member of Pakistan national football team.

Hashmi plays as a midfielder. He was called up to the Pakistan squad during the 2008 friendlies with Nepal.

References

Pakistani footballers
Pakistan international footballers
1989 births
Living people
Association football midfielders